Colegio Nuestra Señora de la Altagracia (often called by the acronym CONSA) is a non-profit Catholic school founded in Santo Domingo in the 1950s by Alicia Guerra. The school includes grades from pre-school through high school.

It is located in the Los Prados sector of Santo Domingo. It owes its name to Our Lady of the High Grace, patron saint of the Dominican Republic.

Schools in Santo Domingo